Captain George Alexander Waters (1820-1903) was a British Navy officer.

He served on the Vixen, the Jupiter, the Simoom, and the Shannon, which he first commanded while Sir William Peel led the Naval Brigade, before taking permanent command.

He was later Queen's Harbour Master, firstly at Malta and finally at Sheerness, before retiring in 1876.

He is buried at Kensal Green Cemetery.

References

1820 births
1903 deaths
Burials at Kensal Green Cemetery
Royal Navy officers